A Three-Pipe Problem is a 1975 mystery detective novel by the British writer Julian Symons. A pastiche of the original Sherlock Holmes stories by Arthur Conan Doyle, it takes place in the present day. The title refers to a line spoken in The Red-Headed League, referring to a particularly tricky problem that will take Holmes the time it takes to smoke three pipes to solve. It was followed by a sequel The Kentish Manor Murders.

Synopsis
Overbearing and reactionary actor Sheridan Haynes has a fascination with Sherlock Holmes, and is cast to play him in a new television series. Overidentifying with the role he sets out to investigate three murders that Scotland Yard have failed to solve.

References

Bibliography
 Bargainnier, Earl F. Twelve Englishmen of Mystery. Popular Press, 1984.
 Caserio, Robert L. The Cambridge Companion to the Twentieth-Century English Novel. Cambridge University Press, 2009.
 Reilly, John M. Twentieth Century Crime & Mystery Writers. Springer, 2015.

1975 British novels
Novels by Julian Symons
British detective novels
British crime novels
British mystery novels
Novels set in London
Collins Crime Club books
Sherlock Holmes novels
Sherlock Holmes pastiches